SR1 may refer to:


Science and mathematics
 SR1 RNA, a small RNA produced by bacteria
 SR1, a candidate phylum of bacteria more commonly called Absconditabacteria
 Symmetric rank-one, a mathematical algorithm

Products and technology
 HDR-SR1, a Sony camcorder
 Peugeot SR1, a hybrid concept car
 Radical SR1, a sports car
 Vintage Ultralight SR-1 Hornet, an American homebuilt aircraft
 VR Class Sr1, a class of Finnish electric locomotives
 VSR SR-1 Snoshoo, an American Formula One racing aircraft design
 Six Chuter SR1, an American powered parachute design
 SR1, a FIA Sportscar Championship classification
 SR1, a 4-stroke Yamaha motorcycle
 SR.1, a semi-rigid airship built in 1918 for the British navy
 SR-1 Vektor, a Russian pistol

Media
 Saints Row (2006 video game)
 SR1 Europawelle, radio programming by Saarländischer Rundfunk (Saarland Broadcasting)

Other
 SR1, a spelling reform proposal
 State Route or State Road 1; see List of highways numbered 1